Stephen John Simon Warke (born 11 July 1959), in North Belfast, is an Irish former cricketer and national captain.

Cricket career
A right-handed opening batsman, when he retired in 1996 Warke held the national record for most caps, with 114. His 4,275 runs for Ireland was also a record.

Warke was selected to captain Ireland in their maiden ICC Trophy event, in Kenya in 1994, but withdrew due to injury.

References

External links
 
 Stephen Warke Profile
 Stephen Warke Photographic Features

1959 births
Living people
Irish cricketers
Cricketers from Belfast
Cricketers from Northern Ireland